The ARCA Menards Series East (formerly Busch East Series, Busch North Series, Camping World East Series, and NASCAR K&N Pro Series East) is a regional stock car racing series owned and operated by the Automobile Racing Club of America (ARCA) and the National Association for Stock Car Auto Racing (NASCAR).

Most races are stand-alone events (i.e. not in conjunction with other NASCAR touring series), but there are three race weekends that are in combination with the NASCAR Cup Series.

Many of the ARCA Menards Series East drivers on the series are gaining experience with the hopes of moving up to one of the major NASCAR series, however some of the drivers are right at home in the series and have no plans of moving on. The series is not only developmental for drivers (including Joey Logano, Martin Truex Jr., Ricky Craven, Mike McLaughlin, Austin Dillon, Trevor Bayne, Brian Ickler, Ricky Carmichael and Ryan Truex), but for crew members (such as Greg Zipadelli and Marc Puchalski) and officials, as well.

In 1994, it became the first NASCAR-sanctioned series to have a winless season champion when Dale Shaw won the then-Busch Grand National North Series championship without winning a single race all year. The series had the distinction of being the only NASCAR series in which this had happened until 2013, when Austin Dillon won the Nationwide Series championship the same way. Matt Crafton would also do this in the Truck Series in 2019.

The other regional division at the Grand National level of ARCA is the Menards Series West.

History

Formed as the NASCAR Busch Grand National North Series in 1987, the series originally raced primarily in the Northeastern United States, including Maine, New Hampshire, Vermont, Massachusetts, New York, New Jersey, Connecticut, and Pennsylvania. Drivers in the series could compete in "combination" races with then named Busch Grand National Series (now Xfinity Series) that were held at various tracks over the years, including but not limited to Daytona International Speedway, Nazareth Speedway, Watkins Glen International and New Hampshire Motor Speedway. Combination races were on the schedule until 2001. In 2002, a big crash occurred at the Glen that saw many cars spinning through the esses on lap one, along with Troy Williams actually overturning over the guardrail. No one was hurt.

Over the next 18 years, the series extended its reach and added races in Delaware and Virginia. The series name was changed to Busch East for the 2006 season after a race was added in Greenville-Pickens Speedway in South Carolina. Races were added in South Boston, Virginia, and Nashville, Tennessee for 2007 to continue the push South and West, as well as East-West combination races at the Iowa Speedway in Newton, IA and Elko Speedway in Elko, MN.. The 2008 schedule had the series running races in 8 states up and down the East coast. (Connecticut, Delaware, Iowa, New Hampshire, New York, Ohio, South Carolina, Tennessee and Virginia)

In 2012, NASCAR unified the rules of the NASCAR K&N Pro Series  Invitational and North/East Series to a many  rules package. A pre -season invitational race known as the Toyota All-Star Race was also added to pit the best drivers from both series head-to-head.

For 2013 NASCAR made several rule changes including giving team the option of using "special" engines and a composite body to reduce the cost of competing in the K&N Series. The "spec" engine has become fairly popular, but the old style steel bodies are still preferred over the composite bodies by most teams. Chase Elliott won the series at 2010, and 2011.

On December 16, 2019, NASCAR announced that Camping World would take over as title sponsor of both series in the Grand National Division.

For 2015, the names of both the East and West series were both sponsored by K&N Engineering and the East Series was named the K&N Pro Series East. In 2011, NASCAR lowered the age maximum across each of its regional touring series to 30.

In 2020, the series became part of the ARCA Menards Series banner and was renamed to the ARCA Menards Series East.

ARCA Menards Series cars

General
As part of NASCAR's unification of the two Camping World Series in 2003, the cars can be either a 105-inch (2,700 mm, which had been used in the former Busch Grand National East) or 110-inch (2,800 mm, which had been used in the former Winston West) wheelbase. Cambered/off-set rear ends are not allowed.

Currently, the series requires the use of a Five Star bodies composite body that started in the 2015 season, currently the 2013 Chevrolet SS, Ford Fusion, or Toyota Camry.  Since the 2007 debut of the new chassis at the Cup and 2010 debut at the second-tier level, many K&N Pro cars are old Cup or Xfinity cars.

Teams have an option of building their own engines or they may run a specification engine, similar to what is used in many short tracks. Both engines are V8, pushrod, 12:1 compression motors.  "Built" motors are built to team specifications using any configuration of pieces as long as it still meets NASCAR specifications. The spec engine is built using NASCAR-Approved pieces that may be purchased from an approved supplier. The engines may be purchased as a kit or pre-assembled. All of the spec pieces are individually encrypted with a barcode for verification and tracking purposes and can be checked during the inspection process with an encryption reader.  NASCAR has a specification supplier for the series-specification engine.

When the series first started, the cars ran a V6 engine with a maximum  displacement and no compression limit. In the early/mid 1990s the V8 engine with a 9.5:1 compression and maximum  displacement was introduced to the series as an alternative to the V6 engines. Due to the decrease in popularity of the V6, it was phased out for the 1999 season. When the East and West series rules were combined, the compression ratio changed to 12:1.

Menards Series cars use Sunoco racing fuel, NASCAR's specification fuel.  For races run with national series, the cars run an E15 blend since the national series uses such fuels. The cars use radial tires. Along with the rest of ARCA and NASCAR's international series, the Menards Series have General Tire as their exclusive tire supplier.

On November 4, 2014 at the SEMA Show in Las Vegas, NASCAR president Mike Helton unveiled a new body style for the K&N Pro Series based on the NASCAR Cup Series Gen 6 models. The new body, developed with Five Star Race Car Bodies, is constructed of a composite laminate blend and designed with easily replaceable body panels, expected to shrink the costs of fabrication dramatically. The body style is eligible for use in both Menards Series competition and ARCA Racing Series competition, replacing the old Gen 4-style steel bodies after 2015, and the current one-piece composite body after 2016.

Specifications

Engine displacement:  358 cu in (5.8 L) Pushrod V8.
Transmission:  4 speed Manual.
Weight:  3,300 lb (1,497 kg) Minimum (without driver).
Power output:  ~650 hp (485 kW) unrestricted.
Fuel: Sunoco Leaded or Unleaded gasoline.
Fuel capacity:  22 U.S. gallons (83.2 L).
Fuel delivery: Carburetion.
Compression ratio:  12:1.
Aspiration: Naturally aspirated.
Carburetor size:  390 cu ft/min (184 L/s) 4-barrel.
Wheelbase:  105 in (2667 mm)/ 110 in (2794 mm).
Steering: Power, recirculating ball.

List of champions

 Bold driver indicates that he/she has won at least 1 NASCAR Cup Series championship.
 Italicized driver indicates that he/she has won at least 1 NASCAR Xfinity Series championship.
 Bold and italicized driver indicates he/she has won both a NASCAR Xfinity Series and a NASCAR Camping World Truck Series championship (at least 1 of each).

Career victories

In 517 races there have been 126 different winners, 73 of which have won multiple races. Does not include Combination races with Busch Series that were won by Busch Series drivers since these victories are already counted in the Busch Series. Updated after: Sprecher 150 (August 28, 2022)

Bolding indicates driver has won at least 1 NASCAR Cup Series Championship

Most wins at each track
All-time wins under Menards Series East banner. Does not include the combination races with Busch Series because the drivers who won those races are computed as Busch Series winners. Also does not include the combination races with Menards Series West that were won by Menards Series West drivers because the drivers who won those races are computed as Menards Series West winners.

Current tracks

Bold indicates a combined race with the ARCA Menards Series West

Former tracks

Races in Bold were combination events with the then NASCAR Busch Grand National Series

References

 2008 NASCAR Camping World Series Rule Book
 The Official NASCAR 2008 Preview and Press Guide
 1996 NASCAR Busch North Series Rule Book

External links

 Official website
 EastSeries.com Series – News & Coverage

 
ARCA Menards Series
Auto racing series in the United States
Stock car racing
Stock car racing series in the United States
K&N Pro